Lachlan Ross Power (born 25 August 1995) is an Australian YouTuber, professional gamer and internet personality, known primarily for his video game commentaries of Fortnite Battle Royale. He is the founder of lifestyle brand and gaming organization PWR.

In 2013, Power registered his YouTube account under the name CraftBattleDuty and primarily posted video game commentaries of Minecraft, Battlefield and Call of Duty. His channel experienced substantial growth in popularity when he began posting videos of Fortnite in 2017. In January 2019, his channel reached 10 million subscribers, becoming the first Australian gaming content creator to hit that milestone. As of September 2022, the channel had reached over 14.8 million subscribers and 5 billion video views, ranking as the sixth most-subscribed and fifth most-viewed channel on the platform from Australia.

Early life
Lachlan Ross Power was born on the 25th of August 1995, in Brisbane, Queensland, and grew up in Shailer Park, Queensland. His mother, Lynne, is a bank manager and his father Darren Power is a local politician, currently serving as the mayor of Logan City. Power has three siblings.

Career 
Power registered the "CraftBattleDuty" YouTube channel on 19 March 2013. His early content primarily featured video game commentaries of Minecraft, Battlefield and Call of Duty; his channel name comes from a concatenation of these three games. His channel experienced a substantial growth in popularity when he began playing Fortnite Battle Royale in 2017.

In January 2019, his channel reached 10 million subscribers, becoming the first Australian gaming content creator to hit that milestone. In October 2019, during Fortnite's season-ending live event "The End", Power's stream on YouTube peaked at 198,976 concurrent viewers. On 29 October 2019, it was announced that Power had signed a deal with YouTube to stream exclusively on that platform; he had previously also streamed on Twitch.

In June 2020, Power launched a professional esports Fortnite team based in Queensland, Australia, called PWR, which later expanded to being a gaming, entertainment, and apparel brand. He had previously launched a merchandise brand, Power by Lachlan, in 2018. In October 2020, Power received his own Fortnite outfit as part of the Fortnite Icon Series.

Charitable work 
In January 2019, Power participated in the charity Pro–Am event at the Australian Open Fortnite Summer Smash. He partnered with actor Liam McIntyre at the Fortnite World Cup Pro-Am in July 2019 and finished in 18th place; $20,000 donated to charity. In October 2019, Power donated $15,000 to Team Trees, a fundraising drive taking action against deforestation by pledging to plant one tree for every dollar donated. In January 2020, Power did a charity live stream to raise money for the ongoing Australian bushfire relief effort and raised $34,849, which included a donation of $30,000 from streamer Ninja. That month, he partnered with Epic Games to raise awareness for the International Committee of the Red Cross (ICRC) by being one of the first to play the new Fortnite game mode "Liferun", where players take part in life-saving missions similar to those of the ICRC. In February 2020, Power won the second edition of the Fortnite Summer Smash Pro-Am, along with fellow Australian YouTuber Fresh and musician Enschway, with $30,000 being donated to charities of their choice.

Filmography

Awards and nominations

References

External links 
 

1995 births
Australian YouTubers
Gaming YouTubers
Let's Players
Living people
Minecraft YouTubers
People from Brisbane
Twitch (service) streamers
Video bloggers
Australian video bloggers
Video game commentators
YouTube channels launched in 2013
YouTube vloggers